Xu Xiang (born 29 November 1972) is a Chinese sports shooter. She competed in the women's double trap event at the 1996 Summer Olympics.

References

1972 births
Living people
Chinese female sport shooters
Olympic shooters of China
Shooters at the 1996 Summer Olympics
Place of birth missing (living people)